"Weekend Without Makeup" was the first single to be taken from the Long Blondes' first album Someone to Drive You Home. It was released on July 26, 2006, on CD, double 7-inch single and digital download. The single reached number 28 in the UK Singles Chart.

Paintings
 The two front covers of Weekend Without Make-Up are paintings of Diana Dors.

Track listing
All lyrics written by Dorian Cox|Kate Jackson, music by The Long Blondes.

CD
 Side A "Weekend Without Makeup"
 Side B "Fulwood Babylon"

7-inch 1
 Side A "Weekend Without Makeup"
 Side B "Platitudes"

7-inch 2
 Side A "Weekend Without Makeup"
 Side B "Last Night on Northgate Street"

Digital download
 1. "Weekend Without Makeup"
 2. "Fulwood Babylon"
 3. "Platitudes"
 4. "Last Night on Northgate Street"

References

2006 singles
The Long Blondes songs
2006 songs
Rough Trade Records singles
Songs written by Kate Jackson (singer)
Songs written by Dorian Cox